Ekaterina Degot (Екатерина Дёготь; b. December 2, 1958, Moscow) is a Russian art historian, art writer, and curator based in Moscow, Cologne and Graz.

Biography 

A member of the Russian Academy of Fine Arts, she received her doctoral degree in art history, specializing in Russian art of the 20th century and Russian contemporary art. She has worked as a senior curator at the State Tretyakov Gallery, art columnist at the Russian daily newspaper Kommersant, and senior editor from 2008 to 2012 at an independent online  magazine dedicated to art news, art criticism, and cultural analysis—www.openspace.ru/art. She is a regular contributor to international art journals and magazines such as Artforum,  frieze,  and e-flux magazine. After teaching at the European University at Saint Petersburg and holding guest professorships at various American and European universities, she is presently a professor at the Alexander Rodchenko School of Photography and New Media in Moscow.
2013 she was Artistic Director of the first Bergen Assembly in Norway, 2014 she was appointed Artistic Director of Academy of the Arts of the World, Cologne. 2017 she was appointed Intendant of Steirischer Herbst in Graz, Austria.

Curated Exhibitions 

(with Julia Demidenko). 2000. Body Memory: Underwear of the Soviet Era. City History Museum (St Petersburg), City Museum (Helsinki), Volkskundemuseum (Vienna), et al.
2001. The Russian Pavilion. The Venice Biennale.
(with Jürgen Harten et al.). 2003-04. Moscow--Berlin 1950–-2000. Martin-Gropius-Bau (Berlin), the History Museum (Moscow).
2005a. The Comedy: the Funny Side of a Moving Image. Central House of Artists (Moscow).
2005b. Soviet Idealism. Musee de l’art wallon (Liège).
2009. European Atelier: Russian Artists on Europe. Central House of Artists (Moscow).

Books 

1998. Terroristicheskii naturalizm [Terrorist naturalism]. [In Russian]. Moscow: Ad Marginem.
2000. Russkoe iskusstvo XX-go veka [Russian art of the 20th century]. [In Russian]. Moscow: Trilistnik.
(and Vadim Zakharov). 2005. Moskovskii kont︠s︡eptualizm [Moscow conceptualism]. [In Russian]. Moscow: Izdatelstvo WAM。

Distinctions 

1995. “Courant d’Est” Fellowship, Centre Pompidou, Paris.
1998. Fulbright Scholarship.
1999. Virginia Hanks Distinguished Visiting Curatorship, Duke University Museum of Art.
2003. Zentrum für Literaturforschung Fellowship, Berlin. 
2004. “Post Communist Condition” Fellowship. ZKM Karlsruhe.
2004. Visiting Curatorship. Jane Voorhoos Zimmerli Museum of Art, New Brunswick, NJ.

References 
 Екатерина Деготь на сайте Российской секции Международной ассоциации художественных критиков
 Екатерина Деготь на сайте Российской академии художеств
 Пресс-конференция Е. Деготь на сайте Lenta.Ru
 Екатерина Деготь: «Потребительство публики нужно сознательно ломать, а для этого необходимо выходить за рамки эстетического…»
 Почему я не буду работать на COLTA.RU. Екатерина Дёготь о старом OpenSpace.ru и о неизбежности личного выбора
 Steirischer herbst: Ekaterina Degot wird neue Intendantin

1958 births
Living people
Russian art historians
Russian women historians
Curators from Moscow
Russian women curators